Murchisonfjorden is a fjord in Gustav V Land at Nordaustlandet, Svalbard. The fjord cuts eastwards from Hinlopen Strait into Nordaustlandet. It has steep coasts and numerous islands. Murchisonfjorden is named after British geologist Roderick Murchison.

References

Fjords of Svalbard
Nordaustlandet